Emerenciana de Jesus, known colloquially as Emmi de Jesus, is a Filipina politician who is a former member of the House of Representatives of the Philippines, and is affiliated with the feminist political party GABRIELA.

Political views
She along with Arlene Brosas have been critical of Gloria Macapagal Arroyo's disputed election as Speaker of the House, accusing her of being power-hungry and a "Cheater for All Seasons". She strongly opposes the Philippine Drug War, and said that the death of Kian delos Santos should be a moment of Reckoning for its supporters. She also said that “Kian is the face of failure of ‘Oplan Double Barrel’”.

References

Living people
Members of the House of Representatives of the Philippines for Gabriela Women's Party
Year of birth missing (living people)
21st-century Filipino women politicians
21st-century Filipino politicians